Felix Colgrave (born 29 November 1992) is an Australian director, animator, cartoonist, filmmaker, artist and musician. Distribution of Colgrave's work has, to date, been focused on YouTube where his channel has 1.67 million subscribers. Colgrave mainly uses After Effects for his animations.
As of now, his most popular animation is "Double King" with over 73 million views.

Work
Colgrave has been involved in several commercial projects, having worked for clients such as Vice and Comedy Central, as well as for Trip Tank and Off the Air series. He provided some in-game animations for Bethesda Softworks' Fallout 4.

Colgrave's YouTube channel has twenty six of his 2D surreal, psychedelic, animations, half of which have over a million views each. "DOUBLE KING", has over 50 million views as of February 2021. Colgrave also created the music for the DOUBLE KING animation, which he released as an album known as Royal Noises from Dead Kingdoms.

His animation "Man Spaghetti", has been featured on the animation website known as Cartoon Brew Colgrave has directed a number of music videos, including videos for DJ Mustard, Nicki Minaj & Jeremih's "Don't Hurt Me" Fever The Ghost's "SOURCE", and Shoe's "Egg".

He was credited for doing the storyboards for Childish Gambino's music video for Feels Like Summer.

Colgrave was interviewed at the Sydney Opera House with hosts from Comedy Central and Super Deluxe.

Awards and recognition
The animation "CU" has won the best of the month award on the video-sharing website Vimeo. His follow-up work "Flying Bamboo" was also featured as the opening for the Melbourne International Film Festival.

"The Elephant's Garden" won "Best Australian Film" at the Melbourne International Animation Festival in 2014. It has also gained exposure to the public from various web sources. Both "DOUBLE KING" and "The Elephant's Garden" are featured in the book titled Australian Animation: An International History.

Personal life
Felix Colgrave has been animating since he was a child. One of his first animations, "Last Resort", was created early in 2008 when he was 15 years old.

Colgrave's wife, Zoë is a costume and makeup-artist, known as Trugglet on Instagram They became engaged on 31 October 2016; On 23 February 2019, Colgrave revealed that he has one child with his wife. Currently he lives in Melbourne, Australia.

References

External links

Australian YouTubers
Australian animators
Living people
Australian surrealist artists
1992 births
Music YouTubers
YouTube animators
Artists from Tasmania
Musicians from Tasmania
Australian directors
21st-century Australian artists
Australian filmmakers
Australian cartoonists
YouTube channels launched in 2008